Penkill is an unincorporated hamlet within the Rural Municipality of Snipe Lake No. 259, Saskatchewan, Canada. The community is located (51.314151, -108.632238) approximately 20 km north of the town of Eston, 8 km east of Highway 30 and 4.81 km north of Highway 752 on Range Road 194. Very little remains of the former community, since the railway was pulled up. All that is left is a grain elevator, over grown streets and a couple houses.

References

Snipe Lake No. 259, Saskatchewan
Unincorporated communities in Saskatchewan